Betula humilis, known in English as the shrubby birch, is a species of birch that can be found in Europe and Asia.

References

humilis
Flora of Asia
Flora of Europe